Monte Pruno is a mountain in the southern Cilento region of the Province of Salerno, in the Campania region, of southern Italy.

Geography
The mountain is in the Lucan Apennines mountain range of the Apennine Mountains system. It is located in the Pruno forest area, in the municipality of Roscigno.

Monte Pruno is protected within Cilento and Vallo di Diano National Park.

History
On the mountain outside the town of Roscigno is the archaeological site of Monte Pruno, a settlement of the Oenotrians and the Lucani (7th-3rd centuries BCE).

See also
Monte Bulgheria
Monte Stella

External links

Mountains of Campania
Cilento
Mountains of the Apennines
Archaeological sites in Campania